Polkadot is a blockchain platform and cryptocurrency. The native cryptocurrency for the Polkadot blockchain is the DOT. It is designed to allow blockchains to exchange messages and perform transactions with each other without a trusted third-party. This allows for cross-chain transfers of data or assets, between different blockchains, and for decentralized applications (DApps) to be built using the Polkadot Network.

History
The protocol was created by the Ethereum co-founder Gavin Wood, Robert Habermeier and Peter Czaban, raising over $144.3 million in its Initial coin offering in October 2017. Another private sale in 2019 raised an additional $43 million. Gavin Wood is attributed in coining the term "Web3" in 2014. The white paper for Polkadot was published by Wood in 2016. The Web3 foundation was subsequently launched in 2017. 

Polkadot's initial block (the "genesis block") was released in May 2020. The DOT is its native token, and DOTs were released with the launch of the genesis block.

Technical details
The Polkadot network has a primary blockchain named "relay chain" and many user-created parallel chains called "parachains". The relay chain acts as the governance layer of the network, while parachains are auctioned, enabling independent projects to create and operate their own blockchains that live within the Polkadot infrastructure. A relay chain is responsible for validating data, achieving consensus and ensuring transactions are executed. It is estimated that 1,000 transactions per second can be processed by the network.

Proof of stake
The network uses a proof-of-stake consensus algorithm. The protocol used, Blind Assignment for Blockchain Extension (BABE), is derived from Ouroboros, a protocol created by Aggelos Kiayias.

Bridges and Parathreads
The Polkadot network contains bridges, which connect blockchains and allow data transfer. Bridges provider interoperability with other networks such as Bitcoin or Cardano. Parathreads operate in a similar manner to parachains but follow a "pay as you go" model, not requiring continuous connectivity to the Polkadot network.

Consensus and the DOT token
There are three forms of stakeholders within the Polkadot proof-of-stake consensus model namely:
 Nominators: securing relay chains and determining trusted validators.
 Validators: used for staking DOT, validating proofs from collators and participating in consensus.
 Collators: keep valid records of parachain transactions and send them to validators on relay chain.

DOT token is used for both staking and governance: 
 Staking: ensures network security such as in other proof-of-stake networks by incentivizing network participants to act honestly by holding DOT as collateral for "good" behavior (see Sybil attack). Staking generates rewards for those staking DOT. 
 Governance: DOT users have rights to vote based on weighted stake.

See Also 
 Sybil attack
 Proof of stake
 Bitcoin, Ethereum, Cardano (blockchain platform)

References

External links 
 

Blockchains
Cryptocurrencies
Alternative currencies
Cross-platform software